"The Sweetest Drop" is a song by English musician Peter Murphy, from his fourth solo studio album, Holy Smoke (1992). Written by Murphy and Paul Statham, the song was released as the lead single off the album in 1992, through Beggars Banquet and RCA Records. The album reached number 108 on the Billboard 200 chart, while the single peaked at number 2 on the Billboard Modern Rock Tracks chart.

A music video for the song was directed by Tim Pope.

Music
The song builds the "miasmic" soundscapes over wall-of-sound proportions. The soundscapes are then followed by a chorus, which is described to be "rumbling in like a panzer division." The song then continues with pounding dance rhythms and muted wah-wah guitars, accompanied by the backing singers.

Critical reception
In his album review for Holy Smoke, Ned Raggett of Allmusic stated that the track "You're So Close" would have been a better choice as a lead single. Nevertheless, another Allmusic critic Dave Thompson praised "The Sweetest Drop" in his separate track review, describing it as "the best Roxy Music song that Roxy Music never performed." He stated that the song "drifts in gently to echo the masters' Flesh and Blood/Avalon era", comparing Murphy's vocals to the former Roxy Music member Bryan Ferry. He also noted that "the influence of former bandmates Love and Rockets' "So Alive" does hang around the arrangements a little."

Track listing
 "The Sweetest Drop (Radio Edit)" - 4:19
 "Low Room (Album Version)" - 4:24
 "All Night Long (Live)" - 5:10
 "The Line Between The Devils Teeth (And That Which Cannot Be Repeat) (Live)" - 6:59
 "The Sweetest Drop (Album Version)" - 6:53

Personnel
 Peter Murphy – vocals, production, composition

The Hundred Men
 Terl Bryant – drums, percussion
 Eddie Branch – bass
 Peter Bonas – guitar, acoustic guitar

Additional musicians
 Zoe Caryl – backing vocals (4, 9)
 Alison Limerick – vocals (4, 9)

Other personnel
 Mike Thorne – production, synclavier
 Jason Appleton – production assistant
 Jack Skinner – mastering
 Fernando Kral – engineering, mixing
 Stuart Every – assistant engineer
 Laura Janisse – production assistant

Chart positions

References

External links

1992 songs
1992 singles

Peter Murphy (musician) songs
Beggars Banquet Records singles
RCA Records singles
Songs written by Paul Statham
Song recordings produced by Mike Thorne